Sue Atkins is a television presenter. Atkins appears on ITV's This Morning programme where she presents on parenting issues.  Atkins also regularly appears on BBC Breakfast and the Jeremy Vine show on BBC Radio 2. Atkins conducts regular parenting Q & A phone-ins on BBC Radio. Atkins is also a print journalist, specializing in parenting issues and divorce. Atkins has published several books, including Raising Happy Children for Dummies and Parenting Made Easy.

Career 

A former deputy head teacher, Atkins qualified at St Mary's College, London. She was in the teaching profession for 22 years. She has a Diploma in Life Coaching from the Coaching Academy and is on the International Register of Professional Coaches.

Atkins is a Master Practitioner and Trainer in NLP, having been taught by Paul McKenna and Dr Richard Bandler the co-founder and creator of NLP as well as the Peak Performance Coach Tony Robbins.

Atkins is an Emotional Freedom Technique (EFT) parenting specialist. Atkins regularly assists Paul McKenna at his 'Easy Weight Loss Seminars'.

Since 2010, Atkins has been a judge for the MAD (Mum and Dad) Blogger of the Year Awards.

Atkins is a judge for the National Family Week 'Family of the Year' Competition and the What's On 4 Junior Awards.

References 

Living people
Year of birth missing (living people)